George S. Eccles (1900–1982), the sixth of nine children of Utah industrialist David Eccles and his wife Ellen Stoddard Eccles. He grew up in Logan, Utah and graduated from Columbia University in New York, where he met fellow student Dolores "Lolie" Doré, whom he wed in 1925.
George and his brother Marriner Stoddard Eccles founded First Security Corporation in 1928. He served as CEO of First Security Corporation from 1945 to 1982. In 1960 he and his wife co-founded the George S. and Dolores Doré Eccles Foundation. He received the Golden Plate Award of the American Academy of Achievement, alongside his brother Marriner S. Eccles, at the 1972 Achievement Summit in Salt Lake City.

References 

Businesspeople from Ogden, Utah
Columbia Business School alumni
Latter Day Saints from Utah
1900 births
1982 deaths
Latter Day Saints from New York (state)
20th-century American businesspeople
Eccles family